The 2021 Florida State Seminoles women's soccer team represented Florida State University during the 2021 NCAA Division I women's soccer season. It was the 27th season of the university fielding a program. The Seminoles were led by 17th year head coach Mark Krikorian.

The Seminoles finished the season 21–1–3 and 7–1–2 in ACC play to finish in second place.  As the second seed in the ACC Tournament they defeated Wake Forest and Virginia to win the tournament.  The win was the program's eight ACC Tournament title.  The Seminoles received an automatic bid to the NCAA Tournament and were awarded a number one seed.  The Seminoles defeated South Alabama, SMU, Pepperdine, Michigan, and Rutgers on their way to the tournament final.  In the final, they defeated BYU in a penalty shoot-out to be crowned National Champions. Following the season, Krikorian resigned as head coach.

Previous season 

Due to the COVID-19 pandemic, the ACC played a reduced schedule in 2020 and the NCAA Tournament was postponed to 2021.

The Seminoles finished the fall season 11–0–0, 8–0–0 in ACC play, to finish in first place.  As the first seed in the ACC Tournament, they defeated Notre Dame, Duke, and finally North Carolina to claim the championship. The Seminoles did not play any additional games in the spring season and entered the NCAA Tournament as the ACC's automatic qualifier because they won the ACC Tournament.  They were selected as the first overall seed in the NCAA Tournament and defeated Milwaukee in the Second Round and Penn State in the Third Round.  They advanced past Duke in the Quarterfinals and Virginia in the Semifinals on penalty shootouts.  However, their shootout luck ran out in the Finals, where they fell to Santa Clara to finish as runner-up in the tournament. Jaelin Howell went on to win the Herman Trophy.

Squad

Roster 

Source:

Team management 

Source:

Schedule

Source:

|-
!colspan=6 style=""| Non-conference Regular season

|-
!colspan=6 style=""| ACC Regular season

|-
!colspan=7 style=""| ACC Tournament

|-
!colspan=7 style=""| NCAA Tournament

Awards and honors

Rankings

2022 NWSL Draft

Source:

References 

Florida State
Florida State
Florida State women's soccer
Florida State
2021
NCAA Division I Women's Soccer Tournament College Cup seasons